Poldasht County is in West Azerbaijan province, Iran. The capital of the county is the city of Poldasht. At the 2006 census, the region's population (as Poldasht District of Maku County) was 38,586 in 8,758 households. The following census in 2011 counted 42,071 people in the newly formed Poldasht County, in 10,654 households. At the 2016 census, the county's population was 42,170 in 11,537 households.

The historical Saint Stepanos Monastery, in the village of Dar-e Sham, in the Gejlarat area of Poldasht, draws tourists and the faithful from Iran and around the world. It was built in the Armenian style during the Safavid era.

Administrative divisions

The population history and structural changes of Poldasht County's administrative divisions over three consecutive censuses are shown in the following table. The latest census shows two districts, four rural districts, and two cities.

References

 

Counties of West Azerbaijan Province